A Real American Hero is an American television movie that aired on CBS on December 9, 1978. It runs 90 minutes. The film was directed by Lou Antonio and written by Samuel A. Peeples.

Overview
The movie, which is set in 1978 and includes a disco reference, is about the real-life sheriff Buford Pusser, who goes after a criminal who has killed young people with his illegal moonshine. Brian Dennehy plays Pusser. The rest of the cast include Ken Howard, Sheree North, Forrest Tucker, and Brian Kerwin. The film was originally entitled "The Letter of the Law" (which appears in the closing credits) and was released on VHS as "Hard Stick".

Cast

Main
 Brian Dennehy as Buford Pusser
 Forrest Tucker as Carl Pusser
 Brian Kerwin as Til Johnson
 Ken Howard as Danny Boy Mitchell
 Sheree North as Carrie Todd

Supporting
 Lane Bradbury as Debbie Pride
Brad David as Mick Rodgers
 Ed Call as Grady Coker (credited as Edward Call)
 W.O. Smith as Obra Eaker
 Julie Thrasher as Dwana Pusser
 Jason Hood as Mike Pusser
 Ann Street as Grandma Pusser
 George Boyd as Lloyd Tatum
 Maureen Shannon as Amelia Biggins (credited as Maureen Burns)
 Charlie Briggs as Miles Conway
 Elizabeth Lane as Sabrina Marlowe

References

External links
 

1978 television films
1978 films
1970s action thriller films
American biographical films
CBS network films
Films set in Tennessee
Films shot in Tennessee
Walking Tall (films)
Live action television shows based on films
Films directed by Lou Antonio
1970s American films